Joseph Denis Emile DeJordy (born November 15, 1938), is a Canadian former professional ice hockey player.  He played goal for four National Hockey League teams, most notably the Chicago Black Hawks.  In 1966–67, he and Glenn Hall won the Vezina Trophy for the best goals-against average in the NHL.

Playing career
DeJordy played junior hockey with the Junior B Dixie Beehives in 1956–57 and the Major Junior A St. Catharines Teepees of the Ontario Hockey Association.  In two seasons in St. Catharines he helped the Teepees to the top of the Ontario League.  Stan Mikita was the team's offensive leader at the time; he and DeJordy were later teammates with the Chicago Black Hawks for several seasons.

DeJordy's began his professional career with the Sault Ste. Marie Thunderbirds of the EPHL and the Buffalo Bisons of the AHL. He was first called up by the Black Hawks during the 1960-61 playoffs, but did not play.  His name was engraved on the Stanley Cup and he appeared in the Hawks' Stanley Cup team picture, even though he had yet to play a single NHL game.  He played his first NHL game  on November 7, 1962, when he replaced Glenn Hall, who had left the game with a back injury.  (That injury brought an end to Hall's streak of 502 consecutive complete games, a league record.)  DeJordy played five games that season for Chicago.  In 1966–67, DeJordy and Hall won the Vezina Trophy for the best goals-against average in the league.

When the Black Hawks acquired Tony Esposito from the Montreal Canadiens, DeJordy was relegated to backup for the 1969–70 season.  He then played for the Los Angeles Kings for three seasons.  In the fall of 1971, he was traded to Montreal, where he became the backup to Ken Dryden, who had played a large part in leading the Canadiens to the Stanley Cup the previous spring. DeJordy played seven games that season.  He was then dealt to the Detroit Red Wings and played parts of two seasons there, with stints in the minor leagues.  He then became a goaltending coach for the Wings, the first in the NHL.

During his career, DeJordy owned a sporting goods store in his home town of St. Hyacinthe, Quebec. Dejordy's brother Roger DeJordy was a veteran minor league hockey player and was enshrined in the Hershey Bears Hockey Club Hall of Fame in 2015.

Awards
Selected to the OHA-Jr. First All-Star Team in 1959.
EPHL Best Rookie Award Winner in 1960.
Stanley Cup Championship in 1961.
Les Cunningham Award Winner in 1963.
Harry "Hap" Holmes Memorial Award Winner in 1963.
Selected to the AHL First All-Star Team in 1963.
Selected to the CPHL First All-Star Team in 1966.
Vezina Trophy Winner in 1967 (shared with Glenn Hall).
Selected to the AHL Second All-Star Team in 1974.

Career statistics

Regular season and playoffs

References

External links

1938 births
Living people
Baltimore Clippers players
Buffalo Bisons (AHL) players
Canadian ice hockey coaches
Canadian ice hockey goaltenders
Chicago Blackhawks players
Detroit Red Wings players
Ice hockey people from Quebec
Laval National coaches
Los Angeles Kings players
Montreal Canadiens players
Peterborough Petes (ice hockey) players
Sault Thunderbirds players
Sportspeople from Saint-Hyacinthe
St. Catharines Teepees players
Stanley Cup champions
Vezina Trophy winners